Say No More is the third studio album by Bob Ostertag, released in 1993 by RecRec Music.

Reception

François Couture of AllMusic called Say No More "a classic" and "the border between free improvisation and musique concrete will never be the same." Musicworks gave the album a positive review, saying "the practice of sampling sounds creates its own contextual questions, of course, and those posed by Bob Ostertag were the most puzzling."

Track listing

Personnel
Adapted from the Say No More liner notes.

Musicians
 Joey Baron – percussion (1)
 Mark Dresser – bass guitar
 Gerry Hemingway – percussion (2)
 Phil Minton – voice
 Bob Ostertag – sampler

Production and design
 Ilia Vasella – design
 David Wojnarowicz – photography

Release history

References

External links 
 Say No More at Bandcamp
 Say No More at Discogs (list of releases)

1993 albums
Bob Ostertag albums
RecRec Music albums
LGBT-related albums